Eero Ilmari Salonen (25 July 1932, Helsinki – 22 May 2006, Thailand) was a Finnish basketball player.

He played for the Finland national basketball team from 1952 until 1959, wearing jersey number 11. He competed with that team in the 1952 Summer Olympics and the EuroBasket championships of 1953, 1955, 1957, and 1959.

After his retirement, Salonen lived in Thailand with his Thai wife.

References

External links
Urheilutoimittaja Eero Salonen, Helsinki Sanomat 

1932 births
2006 deaths
Finnish men's basketball players
Basketball players at the 1952 Summer Olympics
Olympic basketball players of Finland
Finnish expatriate sportspeople in Thailand
Sportspeople from Helsinki